The Pakhra is a river in Moscow Oblast and the city of Moscow, Russia, a right tributary of the Moskva. It is 135 km in length. The area of its basin is 2580 km². The Pakhra River freezes up in November–December and stays under the ice until the late March–April. Main tributaries: Mocha and Desna. Gorki Leninskiye and Podolsk stand on the Pakhra River.

References

Rivers of Moscow Oblast